Mamoea is a genus of South Pacific intertidal spiders first described by Raymond Robert Forster & C. L. Wilton in 1973.

Species
 it contains nineteen species, all found in New Zealand:
Mamoea assimilis Forster & Wilton, 1973 – New Zealand
Mamoea bicolor (Bryant, 1935) – New Zealand
Mamoea cantuaria Forster & Wilton, 1973 – New Zealand
Mamoea cooki Forster & Wilton, 1973 – New Zealand
Mamoea florae Forster & Wilton, 1973 – New Zealand
Mamoea grandiosa Forster & Wilton, 1973 – New Zealand
Mamoea hesperis Forster & Wilton, 1973 – New Zealand
Mamoea hughsoni Forster & Wilton, 1973 – New Zealand
Mamoea inornata Forster & Wilson, 1973 – New Zealand
Mamoea mandibularis (Bryant, 1935) – New Zealand
Mamoea maorica Forster & Wilton, 1973 – New Zealand
Mamoea montana Forster & Wilton, 1973 – New Zealand
Mamoea monticola Forster & Wilton, 1973 – New Zealand
Mamoea otira Forster & Wilton, 1973 – New Zealand
Mamoea pilosa (Bryant, 1935) – New Zealand
Mamoea rakiura Forster & Wilton, 1973 – New Zealand
Mamoea rufa (Berland, 1931) – New Zealand (Campbell Is.)
Mamoea unica Forster & Wilton, 1973 – New Zealand
Mamoea westlandica Forster & Wilton, 1973 – New Zealand

References

Araneomorphae genera
Desidae
Spiders of New Zealand
Taxa named by Raymond Robert Forster